The 2016–17 Florida A&M Rattlers men's basketball team represented Florida A&M University during the 2016–17 NCAA Division I men's basketball season. The Rattlers, led by third-year head coach Byron Samuels, played their home games at the Teaching Gym as members of the Mid-Eastern Athletic Conference. They finished the season 7–23, 5–11 in MEAC play to finish in a tie for 11th place. They lost in the first round of the MEAC tournament to South Carolina State.

On March 17, 2017, it was announced that head coach Byron Samuels' contract would not be renewed. He finished at Florida A&M with a three-year record of 17–71. On May 16, the school named Oregon assistant Robert McCullum as their new head coach. McCullum had previous head coaching jobs at Western Michigan and South Florida.

Previous season
The Rattlers finished the 2015–16 season 8–21, 4–12 record in MEAC play to finish last in the conference. They were ineligible for the postseason due to APR violations.

Preseason 
The Rattlers were picked to finish in last place in the preseason MEAC poll.

Roster

Schedule and results

|-
!colspan=9 style=| Non-conference regular season

|-
!colspan=9 style=| MEAC regular season

|-
!colspan=9 style=| MEAC tournament

References

Florida A&M Rattlers basketball seasons
Florida AandM Rattlers